Milton Huddart (7 October 1960  – 14 March 2015), also known by the nickname of "Milt", was an English professional rugby league footballer who played in the 1980s.

Background
Huddart was born in Prescot, Lancashire, England, he was the son of Great Britain Rugby League international Dick Huddart, Milton Huddart was married to Joanne, née McLean. They had a daughter, Ashleigh. Huddart was an avid cyclist and keep fit fanatic, but on 13 March 2015 he suffered a cardiac arrest whilst cycling to work and was treated at West Cumberland Hospital prior to being transferred to Cumberland Infirmary later that morning. Despite successful surgery, Huddart died on Saturday 14 March 2015, his wife and daughter were with him throughout.

Playing career

International honours
Huddart won a cap for England while at Whitehaven in 1984 against Wales.

County honours
Huddart won cap(s) for Cumbria including as captain in the 12-48 defeat by Australia during the 1986 Kangaroo tour of Great Britain and France at Craven Park, Barrow-in-Furness on Tuesday 21 October 1986.

Club career
Huddart made his début for Whitehaven against Fulham in January 1981. Following a disagreement (subsequently resolved) with Gordon Cottier, after Cottier's failure to travel to a match against Salford, Huddart refused to play with Cottier again, in February 1985 Huddart was transferred to Carlisle for £20,000 (based on increases in average earnings, this would be approximately £70,700 in 2013) he was later transferred from Carlisle to Leigh, and he made his début for Leigh against Hull Kingston Rovers alongside the New Zealand international  James Leuluai, he played in Leigh's 8-14 defeat by St. Helens in the 1987 Challenge Cup semi-final during the 1986–87 season at Central Park, Wigan on Saturday 14 March 1987, and played and scored a drop goal in Leigh's 17-10 victory over Warrington at Wilderspool Stadium to avoid relegation during the 1986–87 season.

References

External links
Memories Of Milt

1960 births
2015 deaths
Carlisle RLFC players
Cumbria rugby league team captains
Cumbria rugby league team players
England national rugby league team players
English rugby league players
Leigh Leopards players
Rugby league locks
Rugby league players from Prescot
Whitehaven R.L.F.C. players